San Erthi I Mera is a 2010 pop and hip hop song by the Greek-Cypriot singer Ivi Adamou with the Greek hip hop band Stavento. It was revealed that the song will be released on 13 April 2010 at MAD TV.

Track listing
Digital download
"San Erthi I Mera" - 3:34

Credits and personnel
 Lead vocals – Stavento and Ivi Adamou
 Producers – Meth
 Lyrics – Meth, Mageda
 Label: Sony Music Greece

Music video
The music video was firstly uploaded on 13 April 2010. The video received more than one million views making it one of the most viewed Greek video clips. Later it was blocked worldwide by SME. Later in September it was re-uploaded in StaventoVEVO and the video currently has more than two million views.

Awards
San Erthi I Mera was nominated for three awards at the 2011 MAD Video Music Awards and won one of them.

Charts and certifications

Peak positions

Release history

References

2010 singles
Ivi Adamou songs
Stavento songs
MAD Video Music Award for Best Duet/Collaboration Video
2010 songs
Number-one singles in Greece
Greek-language songs
Song articles with missing songwriters